The Van Leusen reaction is the reaction of a ketone with TosMIC leading to the formation of a nitrile. It was first described in 1977 by Van Leusen and co-workers. When aldehydes are employed, the Van Leusen reaction is particularly useful to form oxazoles and imidazoles.

Mechanism 
The reaction mechanism consists of the initial deprotonation of TosMIC, which is facile thanks to the electron-withdrawing effect of both sulfone and isocyanide groups. Attack onto the carbonyl is followed by 5-endo-dig cyclisation (following Baldwin's rules) into a 5-membered ring.

If the substrate is an aldehyde, then elimination of the excellent tosyl leaving group can occur readily. Upon quenching, the resulting molecule is an oxazole.

If an aldimine is used, formed from the condensation of an aldehyde with an amine, then imidazoles can be generated through the same process.

When ketones are used instead, elimination cannot occur; rather, a tautomerization process gives an intermediate which after a ring opening process and elimination of the tosyl group forms an N-formylated alkeneimine. This is then solvolysed by an acidic alcohol solution to give the nitrile product.

References 

Name reactions
Nitrogen heterocycle forming reactions
Oxygen heterocycle forming reactions